José Ramón Tebar Sáiz (November 6, 1978, Valencia, Spain) is a conductor and pianist, currently Principal Conductor at Florida Grand Opera. He is Artistic Director of Opera Naples. He was Music Director of the Festival of Santo Domingo, Dominican Republic (2009-2015). In March 2015, he was named Principal Guest Conductor of Spain's Palau de les Arts Reina Sofia.

References

External links 
 Bio Palm Beach Symphony Website
  Official Site

1978 births
People from Valencia
Spanish conductors (music)
Male conductors (music)
Music directors (opera)
20th-century conductors (music)
21st-century conductors (music)
Spanish classical pianists
Male classical pianists
Order of Civil Merit members
Living people
Musicians from the Valencian Community
20th-century Spanish musicians
21st-century classical pianists
20th-century Spanish male musicians
21st-century male musicians